Las Heras Station is a station on Line H of the Buenos Aires Underground, opened in 2015. It is located near the University of Buenos Aires faculty of Engineering and the Recoleta Cemetery. The station was opened on 18 December 2015 as the northern terminus of the extension of the line from Corrientes. On 17 May 2018 the line was extended to Facultad de Derecho.

Gallery

References

External links

Buenos Aires Underground stations
Railway stations opened in 2015